Austin Wilkinson Tripper (30 August 1909 – 1993) was an English footballer who played as a winger for Rochdale, Oldham Athletic and Southport He also played non-league football for various other clubs.

References

Rochdale A.F.C. players
Oldham Athletic A.F.C. players
Southport F.C. players
Bury F.C. players
Chorley F.C. players
Macclesfield Town F.C. players
Bacup Borough F.C. players
1909 births
1993 deaths
English footballers
Association football wingers